Worlds Collide is the fourth studio album by Swedish metalcore band Dead by April. It was released on 7 April 2017 through Spinefarm and Universal. It is the first album to feature guitarist/songwriter Pontus Hjelm on co-lead vocals and the last album to feature former unclean vocalist Christoffer "Stoffe" Andersson as he left the band shortly after the album's release. The album debuted at number 8 on the Swedish albums chart. On 1 September 2017 the band released an EP titled Worlds Collide (Jimmie Strimell Sessions), which contains four tracks from Worlds Collide with the original harsh vocals replaced with harsh vocals by returning member Jimmie Strimell.
On 20 October another EP, called Worlds Collide (Acoustic Sessions), was released, containing acoustic versions of 4 songs from the album.

Track listing

Personnel
Credits are adapted from the album's liner notes.

Dead by April
Pontus Hjelm – guitars, clean vocals (except track 9 and 11), additional choirs (track 11), keyboards
Marcus Rosell – drums
Christoffer Andersson – harsh vocals (except for track 10, 11 and Jimmie Strimell Sessions and Acoustic Sessions)
Marcus Wesslén – bass, additional choirs (track 11)

Additional musicians
Jimmie Strimell - harsh vocals (Jimmie Strimell Sessions only)
Tommy Körberg – lead vocals (track 11)
Nils-Petter Nilsson – additional choirs (tracks 1, 6 and 8)
Christopher Kristensen – additional choirs <small>(tracks 1, 6 and 8)
Andréa C-a – additional choirs (tracks 1, 6 and 8)
Beda Odlöw Nyberg – children choir (tracks 1, 6 and 8)
Bella Holmudden – children choir (tracks 1, 6 and 8)
Embla Johansson – children choir (tracks 1, 6 and 8)
Fina Juslin – children choir (tracks 1, 6 and 8)
Julia Lindgren – children choir (tracks 1, 6 and 8)
My Wegnelius Jarlstedt – children choir (tracks 1, 6 and 8)
Nelly Jamarani – children choir (tracks 1, 6 and 8)
Rebecca Tuite – children choir (tracks 1, 6 and 8)
Tora Kopp – children choir (tracks 1, 6 and 8)
Viktor Werlenius – children choir (tracks 1, 6 and 8)
Zelda Ekelun – children choir (tracks 1, 6 and 8)

Production
Pontus Hjelm – producer, recording, engineering
Christian Silver – drum recording, engineering (drums)
Olof Berggren – drum recording, drum engineering (drums)
Ben Grosse – mixing
Paul Pavao – mixing
Henke – mastering

Charts

References

2017 albums
Dead by April albums
Spinefarm Records albums